Twinam is a surname. Notable people with the surname include:

Ann Twinam (born 1946), American historian
Joseph W. Twinam (1934–2001), American diplomat